Marco Aurelio Zani de Ferranti (23 December 1801 – November 1878) was an Italian classical guitarist and composer.

Biography
Zani de Ferranti was born in Bologna. He began on the violin, but switched to guitar at age 16. In 1820, he moved to Paris  and later to Saint Petersburg, before settling in Belgium. He later toured in France, England, Italy, and the United States. Although praised by Hector Berlioz in 1859, as well as by Rossini and Paganini, Zani de Ferranti found the 1850s to be a period of decline and financial difficulty. He died in Pisa. His son, Giulio Cesare Ziani de Ferranti, moved from Belgium to Liverpool, where he became a portrait photographer, setting up a studio with father-in-law, the portrait artist William Scott. His son, the inventor Sebastian Ziani de Ferranti, established the electronic engineering firm Ferranti in the family name.

Sources

External links

Publications
The King's guitarist: The life and times of Marco Aurelio Zani de Ferranti by Marcus G.S. Van de Cruys
Zani de Ferranti – a biography by Simon Wynberg (Chanterelle, ECH914)

Sheet music
Rischel & Birket-Smith's Collection of guitar music 1 Det Kongelige Bibliotek, Denmark
George C. Krick Collection of Guitar Music Washington University

1801 births
1878 deaths
Italian classical guitarists
Italian male guitarists
Italian classical composers
Italian male classical composers
Italian Romantic composers
Musicians from Bologna
Composers for the classical guitar
19th-century classical composers
19th-century Italian male musicians
19th-century guitarists